Matriarcas (lit: Matriarchs), is a Chilean television soap opera created by Sebastián Arrau, that aired on TVN and TV Chile from May 18, to December 30, 2015, starring Claudia Di Girólamo, Francisco Reyes, Blanca Lewin, Emilio Edwards, Josefina Fiebelkorn, Gloria Münchmeyer, Ximena Rivas, and Juan Falcón.

Cast

Main characters 
 Claudia Di Girolamo as Diana Nazer.
 Francisco Reyes as Gary Mendez.
 Emilio Edwards as Alexis Santis (alias Donor 7).
 Josefina Fiebelkorn as Matilde Valdes (alias Holy Mommy).
 Blanca Lewin as Chantal Chavez (alias Evil Mommy).
 Coca Guazzini as Grace Peñaloza (alias Mommy Mommy).
 Catalina Saavedra as Constanza Rios (alias Crazy Mommy).
 Andrea Velasco as Juliana Flores (alias Selfie Mommy).

Supporting characters 
 Gloria Münchmeyer as Isabelle Stanford.
 Ximena Rivas as Letizia Nazer.
 Juan Falcón as Johnny Bravo.
 Héctor Morales as Eduardo Bravo.
 Santiago Tupper as Mauricio Bravo.
 Rodrigo Muñoz as Arturo Villar.
 Gonzalo Robles as Francisco Alvarez.
 María Elena Duvauchelle as Trinidad Carreño.
 Teresita Commentz as Dianita Stanford.
 Matías Assler as Claudio Chavez.
 Denise Rosenthal as Sandra Bravo.
 Elisa Alemparte as Leonor Castillo.
 Raúl González as Charles Bravo.
 Geraldine Neary as Amalia Castillo.
 Simón Pascal as Jorge Bravo Peñaloza.
 Dolores Pedro as Soraya Benitez.
 Claudia Hidalgo as Hortensia Ortega.

Guest appearances 
 Paloma Moreno as Maria Pepa.
 Bárbara Mundt as Pepa's Mother.
 Carolina Paulsen as Digna Contreras.
 Yamila Reyna as Cristina Hidalgo.
 Simoney Romero as Marion Aranguiz.
 Alessandra Guerzoni as Francesca Miretti.
 Viviana Shieh as Liu King.

Reception

Television ratings

References

External links 
  

2015 telenovelas
2015 Chilean television series debuts
2015 Chilean television series endings
Chilean telenovelas
Spanish-language telenovelas
Televisión Nacional de Chile telenovelas
Television shows set in Santiago